Lawrence A. Galizio (born January 27, 1964) is an American politician and academic who served as a member of the Oregon House of Representatives, representing District 35 from 2004 to 2010.

Early life and education 
Galizio was born in Los Angeles, California. Galizio earned a Bachelor of Arts in Industrial-Organizational Psychology from the University of California, Berkeley, a Master of Arts in Communications Studies from San Francisco State University, and a Ph.D. in Urban Studies from Portland State University.

Career 
At the time of his election, Galizio was the Director of the Forensics Program (competitive speech and debate) and a full-time instructor of communications studies, media studies and public speaking at the Sylvania campus of Portland Community College. He continued to teach at PCC during even-numbered years, as the Oregon Legislative Assembly only meets in session during odd-numbered years.

House District 35 includes parts of Tigard, Southwest Portland, King City, Metzger, and surrounding areas of unincorporated Washington County. Galizio served on the Consumer Protection, Emergency Board, Public Education Appropriation, and Ways and Means committees.

In 2009 he was hired as the Director for Strategic Planning by the Chancellor’s Office of the Oregon University System. From July 15, 2010 to June 30, 2015, Galizio served as president of Clatsop Community College in Astoria, Oregon.
In 2015 he became president and CEO of the Community College League of California located in Sacramento, California.

References

External links
Follow the Money - Larry Galizio
2006 2004 campaign contributions

1964 births
Living people
Members of the Oregon House of Representatives
Portland State University alumni
San Francisco State University alumni
Politicians from Tigard, Oregon
Portland Community College faculty
21st-century American politicians